This is the discography for Norwegian electronic musician Lido.

Albums

Extended plays

Mixtapes

Singles

Featured in

2010: "Once Upon a Time" (Bjørn Johan Muri feat. LidoLido) (Universal Music) (NO #17)

Songwriting and production credits

Remixes

As LidoLido

As Lido

References

External links
 

Discographies of Norwegian artists
Electronic music discographies
Hip hop discographies